Dafydd ap Gwilym ( 1315/1320 –  1350/1370) is regarded as one of the leading Welsh poets and amongst the great poets of Europe in the Middle Ages.

Life
R. Geraint Gruffydd suggests  1315- 1350 as the poet's dates; others  place him a little later from  1320- 1370.

Later tradition has it that Dafydd was born at Brogynin, Penrhyn-coch (at the time Llanbadarn Fawr parish), Ceredigion. His father, Gwilym Gam, and mother, Ardudfyl, were both from noble families. As one of noble birth it seems Dafydd did not belong to the guild of professional poets in medieval Wales, and yet the poetic tradition had been strong in his family for generations.

According to R. Geraint Gruffydd he died in 1350, a possible victim of the Black Death. Tradition says that he was buried within the precinct of the Cistercian Strata Florida Abbey, Ceredigion. This burial location is disputed by supporters of the Talley Abbey theory who contend that burial took place in the Talley Abbey Churchyard:
On Saturday 15 September 1984 a memorial stone was unveiled by a Prifardd to mark the site in the churchyard at Talley where a deeply-rooted tradition asserts that the poet Dafydd ap Gwilym lies buried. For many centuries the rival claims of Talley and Ystrad Fflur have been debated as the burialplace of Wales’ foremost poet.
The first recorded observation that Dafydd ap Gwilym was buried in Talley was made in the sixteenth century. Talley is located about 30 miles from Strata Florida (Welsh: Ystrad Fflur).

Poetry
It is believed that about one hundred and seventy of his poems have survived, though many others have been attributed to him over the centuries. His main themes were love and nature. The influence of wider European ideas of courtly love, as exemplified in the troubadour poetry of Provençal, is seen as a significant influence on Dafydd's poetry.

He was an innovative poet who was responsible for popularising the metre known as the "cywydd" and first to use it for praise. But perhaps his greatest innovation was to make himself the main focus of his poetry. By its very nature, most of the work of the traditional Welsh court poets kept their own personalities far from their poetry, the primary purpose of which was to sing the praises of their patrons. Dafydd's work, in contrast, is full of his own feelings and experiences, and he is a key figure in this transition from a primarily social poetic tradition into one in which the poet's own vision and art is given precedence.

Although Dafydd wrote comparatively conventional praise poetry, he also wrote love poetry and poetry expressing a personal wonderment at nature; Dafydd's poetry on the latter subject in particular is largely without precedent in Welsh or European literature in terms of its depth and complexity. His popularity during his own historic period is testified by the fact that so many of his poems were selected for preservation in texts, despite a relatively short career compared to some of his contemporaries.

Many of his poems are addressed to women, but particularly to two of them, Morfudd and Dyddgu. His best-known works include the following poems:

Morfudd fel yr haul (Morfudd Like the Sun), a poem to the wife of an Aberystwyth merchant who seems to have had a long affair with Dafydd, and whom he addressed in many poems;
Merched Llanbadarn (The Girls of Llanbadarn), in which he speaks of going to church on Sunday in order to ogle the local women;
Trafferth mewn tafarn (Trouble at a Tavern), in which he comically recounts the injuries and difficulties he faces trying to meet his lover in a tavern;
Yr wylan (The Seagull), a poem in which Dafydd asks a seagull to carry a message to his love;
Y Rhugl Groen (The Rattle Bag), in which Dafydd's intercourse with a young girl is cruelly interrupted; and
Cywydd y gal (A Poem in Praise of the Penis), a risqué piece of pure medieval erotica. Until recently not included in editions of Dafydd's works.

The lyrics to the Lied 'Der Traum' in Ludwig van Beethoven's 1810 collection 26 Welsh Songs are a German translation and adaption of Dafydd's dream-vision poem 'Y Breuddwyd'.

See also
 Welsh literature
 List of Welsh language poets
 Dafydd ap Gwilym Society, University of Oxford

Bibliography
 Translations into English Verse from the Poems of Davyth ap Gwilym, a Welsh Bard of the Fourteenth Century (1834). By a translator only identified as Maelog, the bardic name of Arthur James Johnes, with A sketch of the life of Davyth ap Gwilym. Dedicated to William Owen Pughe.
Rachel Bromwich, Dafydd ap Gwilym, Writers of Wales series. (Cardiff, 1974, University of Wales Press). An introduction in English.
 Rachel Bromwich, Aspects of the Poetry of Dafydd ap Gwilym (Cardiff, University of Wales Press, 1986).
 Rachel Bromwich (ed.), Dafydd ap Gwilym: Poems, Welsh Classics series (Llandysul, 2003, Gomer Press).
 Helen Fulton (ed.), Selections from the Dafydd ap Gwilym Apocrypha, Welsh Classics series (Llandysul, 1996, Gomer Press).
 Helen Fulton, Dafydd ap Gwilym and the European Context (Cardiff. 1989, University of Wales Press).
 Richard Morgan Loomis, Dafydd ap Gwilym: The Poems. Medieval and Renaissance Texts and Studies, Center for Medieval and Early Renaissance Studies, Binghamton, New York, 1982. English translations.
 Thomas Parry (ed.), Gwaith Dafydd ap Gwilym (2nd revised ed., Caerdydd, 1963, Gwasg Prifysgol Cymru). Edited texts with extensive notes.
 Gwyn Thomas (ed.), Dafydd ap Gwilym: His Poetry (Cardiff, University of Wales Press, 2001). Includes a complete translation of the poems and an introduction.

Notes

References

External links

 Dafydd ap Gwilym and Welsh literary tradition on the BBC History website.
 
 
 Trafferth Mewn Tafarn – Two English translations of Dafydd ap Gwilym's 'Trafferth Mewn Tafarn'
 Mis Mai a Mis Ionawr – An English translation of Dafydd ap Gwilym's 'Mis Mai a Mis Ionawr'
 A new edition of the work of Dafydd ap Gwilym by a team of academics from the University of Wales

14th-century births
14th-century deaths
14th-century Welsh poets
People from Ceredigion
Welsh-language poets